Janelle Pallister ( Elford, born 13 February 1970) is an Australian swimmer and coach. She competed in two events at the 1988 Summer Olympics. At the 1990 Commonwealth Games she won a gold medal.

She is the mother and coach to Owen Pallister and mother and coach of Australian competitive swimmer and lifesaving athlete Lani Pallister.

References

External links
 

1970 births
Living people
Australian female freestyle swimmers
Olympic swimmers of Australia
Swimmers at the 1988 Summer Olympics
Swimmers at the 1990 Commonwealth Games
Commonwealth Games medallists in swimming
Commonwealth Games gold medallists for Australia
Place of birth missing (living people)
20th-century Australian women
Medallists at the 1990 Commonwealth Games